Robin E. Baker is an American historian and academic administrator, currently serving as the 12th President of George Fox University in Newberg, Oregon. Since he took office in 2007, George Fox has grown to become the third-largest private university in Oregon.

Early life and education 
Baker was born and raised in Phoenix, Arizona. He earned a Bachelor of Arts degree from Grand Canyon University, graduating with high honors. He then received a Master of Arts in history from Hardin–Simmons University and a PhD in history from Texas A&M University.

Career 
Baker began his career in academics as an assistant professor of history at Wheaton College from 1989 to 1992. He then worked as an assistant professor of history at John Brown University in Arkansas from 1992 to 1994.

Baker returned to his alma mater, Grand Canyon University, in 1994 first as an associate professor of history. In 1996, he was named dean of the College of Liberal Arts. In 1997, he became vice president for academic affairs, and in 1998 he was named senior vice president.

Baker joined the faculty of George Fox University in 1999, and served as provost until he was selected by the Board of Trustees as the university's next president in 2007.

References 

George Fox University faculty
People from Phoenix, Arizona
Grand Canyon University alumni
Grand Canyon University faculty
Hardin–Simmons University alumni
Texas A&M University alumni
Living people
Year of birth missing (living people)